Jingzhou railway station is a railway station in Jing County, Hengshui, Hebei, China. It opened with the Shijiazhuang–Jinan passenger railway on 28 December 2017.

References

Railway stations in Hebei
Railway stations in China opened in 2017